SND, or snd, may refer to:
 Scottish National Dictionary
 Serbian National Defense Council, a Serbian diaspora activist organization
 Sinus node dysfunction
 Slovak National Theatre (Slovenské národné divadlo)
 SND Arena, an indoor multi-use venue in Asunción, Paraguay
 SND (band), a Sheffield-based electronic music duo
 SND Experiment (particle physics)
 SND Films, film distributor
 snd, the ISO 639-2 and ISO 639-3 codes for the Sindhi language
 SND, the National Rail code for Sandhurst railway station in the county of Berkshire, UK
 SND, the post-nominal letters of a Sister of Notre Dame de Namur
 SND, the post-nominal letters of a Sister of Notre Dame of Coesfeld
 Society for News Design
 Various digital sound file formats using the .snd extension
Search and Destroy as a gamemode predominantly in first-person shooter titles; the formatting used is often "SnD".

See also